Jordan Tyler Swing (born December 31, 1990) is an American professional basketball player for the Birmingham Squadron of the NBA G League. He played college basketball for Western Kentucky and UAB before playing professionally in the NBA G League, Australia, Spain, Belgium, Israel, and Ukraine.

High school career
Swing attended Vestavia Hills High School in Vestavia Hills, Alabama where he played for coach George Hatchett. As a sophomore playing for the Rebels in 2006–07, he averaged 13 points, six rebounds and four assists per game. As a junior in 2007–08, he averaged 19 points, eight rebounds and three assists per game in earning third-team all-state honors.

On November 13, 2008, Swing signed a National Letter of Intent to play college basketball for Western Kentucky University.

As a senior playing for Vestavia Hills in 2008–09, Swing averaged 19 points, nine rebounds and six assists per game, and led his team to a 28–8 record, including scoring 33 points in the championship game as the Rebels won the Alabama 6A state title. He was subsequently selected as the MVP of the regional and state tournament finals, as well as first-team all-state honoree. To cap off his senior campaign, he was selected as the Gatorade Alabama Player of the Year ahead of front runners Eric Bledsoe and DeMarcus Cousins. The Birmingham News also named Swing as its State Player of the Year.

College career
As a freshman at Western Kentucky in 2009–10, Swing played in 22 games and averaged 2.3 points and 1.1 rebounds in 7.6 minutes per game. On February 18, 2010, he scored a season-high 11 points against South Alabama.

On June 30, 2010, it was announced that Swing would not return to the Western Kentucky for the 2010–11 season. Two weeks later, he returned home to Alabama, transferring to UAB and subsequently sitting out the 2010–11 season due to NCAA transfer regulations.

As a redshirted sophomore playing for the UAB Blazers in 2011–12, Swing stepped right in and made an immediate impact, playing in 28 contests while making 24 starts at a variety of positions including point guard, shooting guard and small forward. He was the team's leading returning scorer (11.2 ppg) and three-point shooter (38.7 percent), and finished the year ranked fourth in Conference USA in three-point shooting percentage and was third in the league in conference games only (42.6). He missed three games between January 25 and February 1 due to a broken right (non-shooting) hand he suffered against UCF on January 21. A month after returning to action, he scored a season-high 22 points, including four three-pointers, in the win over Tulsa on February 29.

As a junior in 2012–13, Swing scored in double figures in 26 of 33 games, and was the team's second-leading scorer with 14.0 points per game. He scored a career-high 24 points, including the game tying basket to send the game into overtime against UTEP on January 30.

In August 2013, Swing participated in the Athletes In Action basketball tour to Lithuania. As a senior in 2013–14, Swing played in 31 games for the Blazers and started in 22 of them. During the season, he scored a season-high 17 points against Chattanooga on December 18, and hit the 1,000 career point mark on February 27 in a 61–60 win over Rice. He finished the season averaging the lowest numbers of his three-year career at UAB, recording 6.0 points, 3.5 rebounds and 2.0 assists in 21.8 minutes per game.

College statistics

|-
| style="text-align:left;"| 2009–10
| style="text-align:left;"| Western Kentucky
| 22 || 0 || 7.6 || .367 || .208 || .750 || 1.1 || .1 || .2 || .1 || 2.3
|-
| style="text-align:left;"| 2011–12
| style="text-align:left;"| UAB
| 28 || 24 || 31.2 || .390 || .387 || .845 || 3.9 || 1.8 || .5 || .2 || 11.2
|-
| style="text-align:left;"| 2012–13
| style="text-align:left;"| UAB
| 33 || 26 || 30.5 || .467 || .359 || .788 || 5.8 || 2.7 || 1.3 || .4 || 14.0
|-
| style="text-align:left;"| 2013–14
| style="text-align:left;"| UAB
| 31 || 22 || 21.8 || .373 || .244 || .696 || 3.5 || 2.0 || .7 || .2 || 6.0
|-
| style="text-align:center;" colspan="2"|Career
| 114 || 72 || 23.9 || .418 || .333 || .785 || 3.8 || 1.8 || .7 || .2 || 8.9
|-

Professional career

Canton Charge (2014–2015)
After going undrafted in the 2014 NBA draft, Swing tried out for the Canton Charge of the NBA Development League in September. He subsequently made the Charge's training camp roster and joined the team in early November. His successful training camp stint and preseason form earned him a spot on the Charge's opening night roster for the 2014–15 season. He made his debut for the Charge on November 15 in the team's season opening game, recording 12 points and 4 steals off the bench in a 109–106 triple-overtime loss to the Delaware 87ers. After playing 39 minutes of action in his first game, Swing's playing time slowly decreased over the course of the season. His final game for the Charge came on December 30, and was later waived by the team on January 14, 2015. Swing played in 11 games for Canton, averaging 4.0 points on .455 shooting with 1.8 rebounds and 0.8 assists in 13.8 minutes per game.

Australia (2015)
Upon being waived by the Canton Charge, Swing moved to Australia to play for the Lakeside Lightning in the 2015 State Basketball League season. During the season, he earned Player of the Week honors for Round 8 and participated in the SBL All-Star Game. The Lightning finished the season in 12th place with a 9–17 record. He appeared in all 26 games, averaging 27.2 points, 8.1 rebounds, 4.8 assists, 1.8 steals and 1.0 blocks per game, earning himself All-Star Five honors at the season's end.

Spain (2015–2016)
On August 14, 2015, Swing signed with Unión Financiera Baloncesto Oviedo of the Spanish LEB Oro. On December 5, 2015, he scored a season-high 42 points in a win over Leyma Básquet Coruña. His final game for Oviedo came on January 3, 2016, scoring just one point in a loss to CB Peñas Huesca. Despite this, two days later, he signed with CAI Zaragoza of the Liga ACB, the top division in Spain. In 16 games for Oviedo, he averaged 17.8 points, 4.5 rebounds, 2.4 assists and 1.5 steals per game.

In his first game for Zaragoza on January 10, 2016, Swing recorded one rebound in six minutes of action against Bilbao Basket. On January 27, he had his best game for Zaragoza, scoring 13 points in 20 minutes of Eurocup action against Dinamo Basket Sassari. In 14 league games for Zaragoza, he averaged 3.1 points and 1.8 rebounds per game. He also appeared in six Eurocup games, averaging 4.2 points and 1.0 rebounds per game.

Belgium (2016–2017)
On August 15, 2016, Swing signed with Limburg United of the Belgian League. In his debut for Limburg on October 1, 2016, Swing scored a season-high 27 points in a 93–90 loss to Leuven Bears. His only other game 20-point game of the season came on January 21, 2017, as he scored 23 points in a 103–90 win over Antwerp Giants. In 39 league games for Limburg in 2016–17, Swing averaged 9.9 points, 4.3 rebounds and 2.6 assists per game. He also averaged 11.7 points, 5.2 rebounds and 4.2 assists in six FIBA Europe Cup games.

Return to Spain (2017–2018)
On July 27, 2017, Swing signed with Real Betis Energía Plus of the LEB Oro, returning for Spain for a second stint. However, on August 23, 2017, his contract was terminated by Real Betis in a mutual agreement. That same day, he signed with Gipuzkoa Basket of the Liga ACB. In 34 games for Gipuzkoa in 2017–18, he averaged 10.4 points, 3.6 rebounds and 1.8 assists per game.

Israel (2018–2020)
On July 12, 2018, Swing signed with Hapoel Be'er Sheva of the Israeli Premier League. On April 12, 2019, Swing participated in the 2019 Israeli League All-Star Game and the Three-Point Shootout during the same event. Swing took part in 36 Israeli League games, averaging 15.4 points, 5.5 rebounds and 3.2 assists per game. Swing helped Be'er Sheva reach the 2019 Israeli League Playoffs, where they eventually were eliminated by Hapoel Jerusalem in the Quarterfinals.

On July 6, 2019, Swing signed a one-year deal with Maccabi Rishon LeZion. On December 22, 2019, Swing recorded a season-high 35 points, while shooting 7-of-12 from three-point range, along with seven rebounds and two assists in a 114–118 triple-overtime loss to Ironi Nahariya.

On February 27, 2020, after parting ways with Rishon, Swing signed with Maccabi Haifa for the rest of the season.

Germany (2020–2021)
On August 29, 2020, Swing signed with the Hamburg Towers of the Basketball Bundesliga.

Mexico (2021)
In 2021, Swing joined Soles de Mexicali of the Mexican LNBP. He averaged 16.1 points, 5.2 rebounds, 3.7 assists and 1.2 steals per game.

Ukraine (2021–2022)
On November 26, 2021, Swing signed with BC Kyiv of the Ukrainian Basketball SuperLeague. He left the team in February 2022, just days prior the Russian invasion of Ukraine.

Birmingham Squadron (2022)
On March 16, 2022, Swing was acquired by the Birmingham Squadron of the NBA G League.

Grises de Humacao (2022)
On April 12, 2022, Swing signed with the Grises de Humacao of the BSN.

Return to Birmingham (2022–present)
On November 4, 2022, Swing was named to the opening night roster for the Birmingham Squadron.

Personal
Swing is the son of Rick and Linda Swing, and has one brother, Josh, and one sister, Danielle.

Swing's wife, Carlee, is a native of Trussville, Alabama.

References

External links

EuroCup profile
Spanish League profile
NBA G League profile
UAB Blazers bio

1990 births
Living people
American expatriate basketball people in Australia
American expatriate basketball people in Belgium
American expatriate basketball people in Germany
American expatriate basketball people in Israel
American expatriate basketball people in Mexico
American expatriate basketball people in Spain
American men's basketball players
Basket Zaragoza players
Basketball players from Alabama
Basketball players from Tennessee
Birmingham Squadron players
Canton Charge players
Hamburg Towers players
Hapoel Be'er Sheva B.C. players
Limburg United players
Liga ACB players
Maccabi Rishon LeZion basketball players
Oviedo CB players
Shooting guards
Small forwards
UAB Blazers men's basketball players
Western Kentucky Hilltoppers basketball players